Staré is a village and municipality in Michalovce District in the Kosice Region of eastern Slovakia.

History
In historical records the village was first mentioned in 1221.

Geography
The village lies at an altitude of 107 metres and covers an area of 6.234 km2. The municipality has a population of about 700 people.
The name was taken from gróf Sztáray.

See also
Church of the Blessed Virgin Mary, Staré

Gallery

References

External links

http://www.statistics.sk/mosmis/eng/run.html
http://www.stare.sk
http://www.obecstare.wz.cz
https://web.archive.org/web/20080110184734/http://www.farnost-stare.sk/

Villages and municipalities in Michalovce District